John M. Facciola (born in 1944) served as a United States magistrate judge for the United States District Court for the District of Columbia, from his appointment in August, 1997 until his retirement in December, 2014.  Prior to being appointed to the bench, he served as an Assistant District Attorney in Manhattan from 1969–1973, and was in private practice in the District of Columbia from 1974–1982. Judge Facciola joined the U.S. Attorney's Office in 1982. He served in the Appellate and Civil Divisions and then as Chief of the Special Proceedings section from 1989 until his appointment as Magistrate Judge. He has been an adjunct professor of law at Catholic University and at Georgetown University Law Center, a fellow of the American Bar Foundation and a member of the Board of Governors of the John Carroll Society. He has been the Editor in Chief of the Federal Courts Law Review, the electronic law journal of the Federal Magistrate Judges Association.  He is also on the Advisory Board for the Sedona Conference, an organization which brings together attorneys, judges, and experts to help advance the law in a collaborative, just and reasoned manner. Facciola has been a leader in issues related to electronic discovery. He has written a number of opinions and lectures frequently on the topic.

Education
Judge Facciola received his bachelor's degree in 1966 from College of the Holy Cross, and his Juris Doctor in 1969 from the Georgetown University Law Center.

Cases of Note
As Magistrate Judge, Facciola has issued several decisions in which he opined on electronically stored information (ESI), discovery practice, and professionalism of the bar.
 In Citizens for Responsibility & Ethics in Washington v. Executive Office of the President, Citizens for Responsibility and Ethics (CREW) filed suit under the Freedom of Information Act against the Office of Administration suggesting that e-mails were improperly deleted from White House computer servers from late 2003 through late 2005, during the time period of the Iraq War and the leak of covert CIA operative Valerie Plame Wilson. Facciola wrote the reports and recommendations adopted by Judge Henry H. Kennedy, Jr. who presided.  Facciola ordered the White House to preserve backups which could contain the missing information. Subsequent objections and requests for dismissal continued until the end of the Bush administration at which time Facciola ordered the Executive Office of the President to search workstations and issue a notice to employees to preserve media that may contain e-mail created or received during that period.
 In United States v. O'Keefe, Judge Facciola dismissed a defendant's objection to the adequacy of keywords used by the prosecution and ruled that a party challenging the efficacy of an opposing party's search terms must do so through expert testimony. He noted the complexity of search in the identification and production of electronically stored information and concluded that "[w]hether search terms or 'keywords' will yield the information sought is a complicated question involving the interplay, at least, of the sciences of computer technology, statistics and linguistics. ... Given this complexity, for lawyers and judges to dare opine that a certain search term or terms would be more likely to produce information than the terms that were used is truly to go where angels fear to tread."
 In Equity Analytics v. Lundin, the plaintiff claimed that a former employee gained illegal access to electronically stored information after he was fired and requested production of material on his personal computer. Judge Facciola concluded that challenges to or defenses of search methodology in producing e-discovery require expert testimony to assist the court such as that contemplated under Federal Rule of Evidence 702.

References

1944 births
United States magistrate judges
Living people
College of the Holy Cross alumni
Georgetown University Law Center alumni
Columbus School of Law faculty